Viking Supply Ships is a supply shipping company based in Kristiansand, Norway. Owned by Kistefos it owns four anchor handling tugs, six platform supply vessels and seven barges as well as for anchor handling tugs on order.

The barges are owned by the subsidiary Viking Barges, but are managed by Taubåtkompaniet. VSS also owns SBS Marine that operates six platform supply vessels. Along with Rederi Trans Atlantic Viking Supply Ships owns the joint venture Trans Viking Icebreaking & Offshore that operates icebreakers.

Supply shipping companies
Shipping companies of Norway
Companies based in Kristiansand
Companies with year of establishment missing
Companies listed on Nasdaq Stockholm